Union School is a private, co-educational, and non-sectarian Pre-K to 12 institution established in Pétion-Ville, Port-au-Prince Arrondissement, Haiti for the purpose of providing an American accredited program of studies in both English and French for students of all nationalities.

Union School is accredited by the Southern Association of Colleges and Schools.

Union School, a university preparatory school, is considered to be an "elite" institution within Haiti.

History 
Union School was founded in Port-au-Prince, Haiti, in 1919 as a school for the children of U.S. Marine Corps families stationed in Haiti. From 1920 to 1934 the school, then named Colony School, was located on Turgeau Avenue with one hundred and ten students. On June 10, 1934, the Marines left Haiti, and the Colony School was left with fourteen students. In 1934, French was also added to the curriculum. In 1943, the school was reopened on the Champs de Mars in downtown Port-au-Prince. It was also in this year that the school was renamed Union School, and the school policy was changed to accept qualified students of all nationalities. The school constructed a building on Harry Truman Boulevard, in Bicentenaire, 1954.

In 1987, Union School operated out of the building that now houses the Karibe Hotel in Juvénat, and in 2001, it moved to its newly constructed campus.

Notable alumni include Charles Henri Baker, Steeven Saba, and Joanne Borgella.

Current 

The school is located on two hectares, with two buildings, 38 classrooms, two computer labs, two science labs, a library with 12,000 volumes and sports fields. The school has an extra-curricular program that includes soccer, volleyball, dance, drama, community service, homework club, and environmental conservation. Union School uses a curriculum that is based on a general United States’ model. Instruction is in English and French, and there is ESL support through Grade 12 for students that need it. Union School has AP and honors classes for high school students. The school gives standardized US tests including the Iowa Test of Basic Skills, the PSAT, SAT, ACT, and TOEFL.

The school consists of an elementary school (grades pre-k to 5), a middle school (grades 6 -8), and a high school (grades 9 to 12). Union School is a member of ACCAS, the Association of Colombian-Caribbean American Schools.

The school's athletic program currently fields teams for he following sports: Girls' Varsity Soccer, Boys' Varsity Soccer, Girls' Volleyball, and Boys' Basketball.

References

External links

 Union School website

Port-au-Prince
American international schools in North America
Schools in Haiti